The Church of Nuestra Señora de la Asunción (Spanish: Iglesia de Nuestra Señora de la Asunción) is a church located in Labastida, Spain. It was declared Bien de Interés Cultural in 1984.

References

External links 

Churches in Álava
Bien de Interés Cultural landmarks in Álava